Pierre Raschi (born 21 February 1971) is a former French rugby union player who spent his whole professional career in Bourgoin, and is currently playing for Fédérale 2 club SO Voiron. He won the European Challenge Cup in 1997 and, the same year, he lost the final of the French championship against Toulouse.

After retiring as a player, he became sport director and then coach of CS Bourgoin-Jallieu until he was fired on April 15, 2008, after a series of bad results.

He joined the amateur club of SO Voiron for the 2005–06 season but played only a few games. He returned for the 2008–09 season and has become a regular in the team.

Notes

1971 births
Living people
Sportspeople from Grenoble
French rugby union players
Rugby union number eights